Yellow Hair and the Fortress of Gold is a 1984 Spanish western comedy adventure film directed by Matt Cimber and starring Laurene Landon, Cihangir Gaffari and Claudia Gravy. It is also known the alternative title Yellow Hair and the Pecos Kid.

The film was shot on location in Almería, particularly in the Tabernas Desert which often featured in European made westerns. It was made in English and distributed in the United States by Crown International Pictures, a specialist in low-budget action films. It was marketed as being a female version of Indiana Jones, although it more closely resembled a 1940s-style Western serial which its opening credits referenced. Cimber had previously directed Landon in Hundra the year before.

Synopsis
A blonde-haired half Apache woman known as Yellow Hair searches in Mexico for a missing temple filled with gold with assistance of her easy-going sidekick the Pecos Kid. They have to face both Colonel Torres of the Mexican Army, also searching for the gold, and the tribe of Indians who are guarding it.

Main cast
 Laurene Landon as Yellow Hair
 Ken Roberson as Pecos Kid
 Cihangir Gaffari as Shayowteewah 
 Luis Lorenzo as Colonel Torres
 Claudia Gravy as Grey Cloud 
 Aldo Sambrell as Flores 
 Eduardo Fajardo as Man-Who-Knows
 Ramiro Oliveros as Tortuga
 Suzannah Woodside as Rainbow
 Concha Márquez Piquer as Gambling Woman
 Antonio Tarruella as Gambling Man

References

Bibliography
 Budnik, Daniel R. '80s Action Movies on the Cheap: 284 Low Budget, High Impact Pictures. McFarland, 2017.

External links 

1984 films
1984 Western (genre) films
Spanish Western (genre) films
1980s English-language films
Films directed by Matt Cimber
Crown International Pictures films
Films shot in Almería
Films set in Mexico
English-language Spanish films
1980s Spanish films